George Washington Emery Dorsey (January 25, 1842 – June 12, 1911) was a Representative in the United States Congress from Nebraska.

Biography
Dorsey was born in Loudoun County, Virginia, and moved with his parents to Preston County, Virginia (now West Virginia), in 1856. He attended private schools and Oak Hill Academy.

During the American Civil War, he recruited a volunteer company and entered the Union Army in August 1861 as a first lieutenant in the 6th Regiment West Virginia Infantry. He was subsequently promoted to captain and major for meritorious service and was mustered out with the Army of the Shenandoah in August 1865.

Dorsey moved to Nebraska in 1866 and studied law. He was admitted to the bar and commenced practice in 1869. He engaged in banking and served as vice president of the State board of agriculture. He was chairman of the Republican State central committee and was elected as a Republican to the Forty-ninth, Fiftieth, and Fifty-first Congresses (March 4, 1885–March 3, 1891). He served as chairman of the Committee on Banking and Currency (Fifty-first Congress) and was an unsuccessful candidate for reelection in 1890 to the Fifty-second Congress. He engaged in mining enterprises in Nevada and Utah.

Dorsey died in Salt Lake City, Utah, and was buried in the City Cemetery, Fremont, Dodge County, Nebraska.

See also

References
 Retrieved on 2008-10-13

1842 births
1911 deaths
Nebraska lawyers
Union Army officers
Republican Party members of the United States House of Representatives from Nebraska
19th-century American politicians
19th-century American lawyers